The 2013–14 Serbian Hockey League season was the 23rd season of the Serbian Hockey League, the top level of ice hockey in Serbia. Seven teams participated in the league, and HK Partizan won the championship.

Regular season

External links
 Season on eurohockey.com
 

Ser
Serbian Hockey League seasons
Serbian Hockey League